Riccardo Sbertoli (born 23 May 1998) is an Italian volleyball player and a member of the Italy men's national volleyball team.

Sporting achievements

Clubs
 FIVB Club World Championship
  Betim 2021 – with Itas Trentino
  Betim 2022 – with Trentino Itas

 National championships
 2022/2023  Italian Cup, with Itas Trentino

References

External links
 

1998 births
Living people
Italian men's volleyball players
Olympic volleyball players of Italy
Volleyball players at the 2020 Summer Olympics
Sportspeople from Milan